Chunghwa County is a county of North Hwanghae, formerly one of the four suburban counties of East Pyongyang, North Korea.  It sits north of Hwangju-gun, North Hwanghae, east of Kangnam-gun, North Hwanghae, west of Sangwŏn-gun, North Hwanghae, and south of Ryŏkp'o-guyŏk (Ryokpo District), Pyongyang. It became part of Pyongyang in May 1963, when it separated from South P'yŏngan Province.  Chunghwa-gun is the location of a few historic sights (both Revolutionary and pre-Japanese occupation), such as the Chunghwa Hyanggyo, as well as a few KPA weapons units. In 2010, it was administratively reassigned from Pyongyang to North Hwanghae; foreign media attributed the change as an attempt to relieve shortages in Pyongyang's food distribution system.

Administrative divisions
The county is divided into one town (ŭp), and 16 'ri' (villages).

References

Counties of North Hwanghae